Only three of the eight Maryland incumbents were re-elected.

References

See also 
 List of United States representatives from Maryland
 United States House of Representatives elections, 1800 and 1801

1801
Maryland
United States House of Representatives